Local rigidity theorems in the theory of discrete subgroups of Lie groups are results which show that small deformations of certain such subgroups are always trivial. It is different from Mostow rigidity and weaker (but holds more frequently) than superrigidity.

History 

The first such theorem was proven by Atle Selberg for co-compact discrete subgroups of the unimodular groups . Shortly afterwards a similar statement was proven by Eugenio Calabi in the setting of fundamental groups of compact hyperbolic manifolds. Finally, the theorem was extended to all co-compact subgroups of semisimple Lie groups by André Weil. The extension to non-cocompact lattices was made later by Howard Garland and Madabusi Santanam Raghunathan.
The result is now sometimes referred to as Calabi—Weil (or just Weil) rigidity.

Statement

Deformations of subgroups 

Let  be a group generated by a finite number of elements  and  a Lie group. Two representations  are said to be conjugated if there exists a  such that  for all . See also character variety.

Lattices in simple groups not of type A1 or A1 × A1

Whenever such a statement holds for a pair  we will say that local rigidity holds.

Lattices in SL(2,C) 

Lattices in SL(2,R) 

In this case local rigidity never holds. For cocompact lattices a small deformation remains a cocompact lattice but it may not be conjugated to the original one (see Teichmüller space for more detail). Non-cocompact lattices are virtually free and hence have non-lattice deformations.

Semisimple Lie groups 

Other results 

There are also local rigidity results where the ambient group is changed, even in case where superrigidity fails. For example, if  is a lattice in the unitary group  and  then the inclusion  is locally rigid.

An irreducible uniform lattice in the isometry group of any proper geodesically complete -space  not isometric to the hyperbolic plane and without Euclidean factors is locally rigid.

Proofs of the theorem 

A more geometric proof which also work in the non-compact cases uses Charles Ehresmann (and William Thurston's) theory of  structures.

References

Discrete groups
Hyperbolic geometry